The 2015 Energiewacht Tour was the 5th edition of the Energiewacht Tour, a stage race primarily held in the Netherlands, with a UCI rating of 2.2, from 8 to 12 April. The last stage took place on the island of Borkum in Germany.

Teams
A total of 22 teams participated in the race.  withdrew from the race in protest against the cost of the race entry fee.

Stages

Prologue
8 April 2015 – Winsum to Winsum, individual time trial (ITT)
The main favourite for the prologue, the World Time Trial Champion Lisa Brennauer was beaten by 5 seconds by Anna van der Breggen. Brennauer said after her race, before Van der Breggen started, that she was pleased with her performance. Another favourite to win the prologue, the former World Time Trial Champion Ellen van Dijk had been ill for the last few days before the prologue and finished ninth, 10 seconds behind Van der Breggen.

Prologue result and general classification

Stage 1
9 April 2015 – Wedde to Ter Apel,

Stage 2a
10 April 2015 – Peize to Peize, team time trial (TTT)

Stage 2b
10 April 2015 – Leek to Zuidhorn,

Stage 3
11 April 2015 – Stadskanaal to Stadskanaal,

Stage 4
12 April 2015 – Borkum to Borkum,

Classification leadership table
 denotes the rider with the lowest accumulated time and is the overall race leader
 denotes the leader of the Points classification
 denotes the leader of the Sprint classification
 denotes the leader of the Combativity classification
 denotes rider with the lowest accumulated time, who is under a specified age and leader of the Youth classification
 denotes the leader of the Club rider classification, which consists of the rider with the best overall time from a non-UCI Women's team

See also
2015 in women's road cycling

References

External links
Official site

Energiewacht Tour
Energiewacht Tour
Energiewacht Tour
Healthy Ageing Tour
April 2015 sports events in Europe